Gotti is a 1996 American crime drama television film directed by Robert Harmon and written by Steve Shagan, based in part on the 1996 non-fiction book Gotti: Rise and Fall by Jerry Capeci and Gene Mustain. The film stars Armand Assante in the title role as infamous Gambino crime family boss John Gotti, along with William Forsythe, and Anthony Quinn. It aired on HBO on August 17, 1996. Assante won an Emmy Award for Outstanding Lead Actor in a Miniseries or Special for his performance. Assante also received a Golden Globe nomination the same year.

Plot
The film starts In 1973 in New York, and ends in 1992, with Gotti's imprisonment. Gotti's association with three mobsters is also highlighted in the film: a father-son like relationship with family underboss Aniello "Mr. Neil" Dellacroce, his deep but rocky friendship with Gotti crew member and longtime friend Angelo Ruggiero, and the respect and ultimate frustration that he felt for the man who became his underboss, Salvatore "Sammy the Bull" Gravano. The film details Gotti's rise within the Gambino crime family and his ranks from soldier, then captain (or capo), and finally, boss. The final title was achieved through the dramatic murder in public of Gambino family boss Paul Castellano in 1985. Following the murder of Castellano, the film concentrates on the legal trials of John Gotti: one for assault and two for racketeering under the Racketeer Influenced and Corrupt Organizations (RICO) statutes. Gotti's famous personality, trial acquittals, and media attention are all dramatized. The film ends with Gotti's conviction and sentencing to life imprisonment at Marion Federal Penitentiary in Marion, Illinois, because Gravano turns state's evidence and agrees to testify against Gotti.  The film is primarily based on the columns of reporter Jerry Capeci, who also wrote the novel that documented Gotti's rise and fall inside the Gambino crime family, and served as executive producer of the film which was based on his novel.

Cast

Production
Shooting took place in Toronto, Ontario, Canada.  Assante put on 35 pounds to play Gotti.

Reception
On review aggregator Rotten Tomatoes, the film holds a 60% rating based on five reviews, with an average rating of 5.20/10.  Jeremy Girard of Variety called it "a fairly standard-issue gangster flick" that is problematic for its matter-of-fact presentation.  Caryn James of The New York Times criticized its "docudrama syndrome", in which biographical dramas adhere closely to the historical record to prevent lawsuits despite the need for more characterization.  Howard Rosenberg of the Los Angeles Times called it "one of the better mob movies of the decade, and surely the best gangster portrait ever made primarily for television".  TV Guide rated it 2/5 stars and described it as too detailed for casual viewers and too inaccurate for enthusiasts.

Awards

See also 
 Witness to the Mob

References

External links

 

1996 films
1996 television films
1996 crime drama films
American films based on actual events
American crime drama films
Biographical films about gangsters
Crime films based on actual events
Crime television films
Cultural depictions of Paul Castellano
Cultural depictions of Carlo Gambino
Cultural depictions of John Gotti
Cultural depictions of the Mafia
Drama films based on actual events
American drama television films
Films about the American Mafia
Films based on non-fiction books about organized crime
Films directed by Robert Harmon
Films scored by Mark Isham
Films set in New York City
Films shot in Toronto
Gambino crime family
HBO Films films
Television films based on actual events
Television films based on books
1990s English-language films
1990s American films